Statistics of American Soccer League in season 1924–25.

League standings

League Cup
In August 1924, the American Soccer League, along with the St. Louis Soccer League, withdrew from the National Challenge Cup. In November 1924, the St. Louis Soccer League executives suggested the two leagues create a replacement tournament open only to teams from the ASL and SLSL. The ASL eventually decided to run a league cup. The winner of that cup would then meet the champion of the St. Louis Soccer League for the title of the American professional soccer champion. In this, its first season, the league ran the cup as a single elimination tournament concurrent with the league schedule. The winners of the final were awarded the H.E. Lewis Cup which had previously been awarded to the Blue Mountain League champions from 1915 to 1919. Boston took the league cup and then defeated Ben Millers in the American Professional Soccer League championship.

Bracket

Final

Goals leaders

External links
The Year in American Soccer – 1925

References

American Soccer League (1921–1933) seasons
1924–25 in American soccer